¿De qué se ríen las mujeres? is a 1997 Spanish comedy film directed by Joaquín Oristrell starring Verónica Forqué, Candela Peña and Adriana Ozores.

Plot 
A female comedy trio formed by the sisters Luci, Graci and Mari travel to Benidorm to perform despite the sudden death of Carlos, Luci's husband, during the wedding of Luqui, the sisters' father.

Cast

Production 
¿De qué se ríen las mujeres? is Joaquín Oristrell's directorial debut in a feature film. Oristrell penned the screenplay alongside Yolanda García Serrano, Juan Luis Iborra and Manuel Gómez Pereira. Fernando Arribas worked as cinematographer whereas Joan Vives was responsible for the music.

Release 
The film was released in Spain on 28 February 1997.

See also 
 List of Spanish films of 1997

References

External links 
 ¿Dé qué se ríen las mujeres? at ICAA's Catálogo de Cinespañol

Films shot in the province of Alicante
Films shot in Madrid
1990s Spanish-language films
1997 comedy films
Films set in the Valencian Community
1990s Spanish films